Yinchuan Township is a township under the administration of Tongjiang, Heilongjiang, China. , it has 5 villages under its administration.

References 

Township-level divisions of Heilongjiang
Tongjiang, Heilongjiang